A by-election was held for the New South Wales Legislative Assembly electorate of Goldfields North on 7 April 1863 because of the resignation of James Hoskins. Hoskins had been supported by a voluntary contribution from miners however he resigned for financial reasons, taking the job of overseer of northern roads.

Dates

Result

James Hoskins resigned.

See also
Electoral results for the district of Goldfields North
List of New South Wales state by-elections

References

1863 elections in Australia
New South Wales state by-elections
1860s in New South Wales